James Roland Dwyer (1902–1983) was an Australian rugby league footballer who played in the 1920s.

Dwyer was a pioneer player for the St. George club in their early years. A huge Front Row Forward from the Brighton juniors, Dwyer played one season for the Saints before embarking on a career in boxing in 1923, and became  national heavy-weight champion under the name Jim Rowland.

Dwyer died in Ramsgate, New South Wales on 13 May 1983.

References

St. George Dragons players
Australian male boxers
Australian rugby league players
Rugby league props
1902 births
1983 deaths